Wayne Pacelle (born August 4, 1965) is one of the leading contemporary animal advocates, having founded or led a set of major animal rights organizations, negotiated agreements on animal rights with major American companies, and helped conceive of and pass statewide ballot measures and federal laws. He is also a two-time New York Times best-selling author.

He is the founder of Animal Wellness Action, a 501(c)(4) organization that promotes legal standards against cruelty and he is president of the Center for a Humane Economy, a 501(c)(3) organization that urges businesses to adopt animal-friendly practices when it comes to their supply chains, research and development, and other operations. He was the president and chief executive officer (CEO) of the Humane Society of the United States (HSUS). Pacelle took office June 1, 2004, after serving for nearly 10 years as the organization's chief lobbyist and spokesperson. Pacelle resigned as CEO on February 2, 2018, after he was accused of sexual assault and harassment by several former employees. Pacelle denied these accusations.

Family and early life 

Pacelle was born in New Haven, Connecticut, of Greek and Italian descent. His parents are Richard L. Pacelle Sr., and Patricia Pacelle. Pacelle is the youngest of four children.  His older brother, Richard L. Pacelle Jr., is a political science professor at The University of Tennessee.
Growing up in New Haven, Pacelle enjoyed reading natural history as a child and developed an early concern about mistreatment of animals. He attended Notre Dame High School and graduated with degrees in history and environmental studies from Yale University. His activism led to his appointment in 1989, at age 23, as Executive Director of The Fund for Animals, the organization founded by Cleveland Amory.

Career with the Humane Society of the United States 

Pacelle secured the passage of dozens of federal statutes and amendments to protect animals, including laws to increase penalties for harming law enforcement animals, protect great apes in their native habitats protections for great apes, sharks, and big cats, elevated punishments for animal fighting, mandated accurate labels for fur, and other legal victories. Pacelle has testified before U.S. House and Senate committees on a wide variety of animal protection issues, including farm animal welfare including calls for increased funding for the Animal Welfare Act and efforts to ban cockfighting, dogfighting, and other harmful practices.

Pacelle has been associated with 26 successful statewide ballot initiatives to protect animals, including measures to prohibit cockfighting, prohibit mourning dove hunting, restrict steel traps and certain poisons, and ban certain farming methods. He has been vocal in criticizing individuals and groups who he says resort to intimidation, vandalism, or violence.

Under Pacelle's direction, the HSUS has secured the adoption of "cage-free" egg-purchasing policies by several hundred universities and corporations; the phase-out of gestation crates by key pork producers nationwide; the exposure of an international trophy hunting scam; successful congressional votes and litigation to end horse slaughter; and an agreement from the United States Department of Agriculture to begin enforcement of federal laws concerning the transportation of farm animals.

 Animal cruelty

In early 2008, the HSUS's investigation of animal treatment at the Hallmark/Westland Meat Packing Company sparked the largest beef recall in American history and congressional calls for reform of the slaughterhouse inspection system. In late February 2008, Pacelle testified on the downer cow issue before a subcommittee of the Senate Agriculture Committee on a panel with USDA Secretary Edward Schafer.

 Successes

Two November 2006 ballot initiatives conducted with HSUS's support outlawed dove hunting in Michigan and abusive farming practices in Arizona.  In January, 2007, several months after passage of the Arizona ballot measure, Smithfield Foods, the largest pork producer in the world, announced that it would phase out the use of gestation crates that immobilize pregnant sows through confinement. Maple Leaf Foods, Canada's largest pork producer and the Strauss Veal company also followed suit.

 Agreement with United Egg Producers

In 2011, Pacelle and Chad Gregory of the United Egg Producers (UEP) agreed to work together in support of federal hen welfare legislation.  This agreement expired in 2013 after the bill supported by the UEP and The HSUS failed to pass.

 Agreement with Sea World

In March 2016, Pacelle and SeaWorld CEO Joel Manby agreed to cooperate on several issues of mutual concern, and SeaWorld agreed to phase out its use of orca whales in performance, to end breeding of captive orcas, and to implement reforms including the introduction of humanely raised products to menus at SeaWorld's theme parks.

 Humane Society Legislative Fund

Pacelle is a cofounder of the Humane Society Legislative Fund (HSLF), a 501(c)(4) social welfare organization that lobbies for animal welfare legislation and works to elect humane-minded candidates to public office. He also cofounded Humane USA, a nonpartisan political action committee (PAC) that supports candidates of any political party based on their support for animal protection. These two organizations helped defeat lawmakers in Congress they consider hostile to animals, including Rep. Chris John of Louisiana, Rep. Richard Pombo of California, and Senator Conrad Burns of Montana.

 Corporate combinations

The HSUS experienced major growth since 2004, primarily as a result of corporate combinations Pacelle forged with The Fund for Animals in 2005 and the Doris Day Animal League in 2006. During the first 30 months of Pacelle's tenure, overall revenues and expenditures grew by more than 50 percent. HSUS's annual budget for 2006 was $103 million. The organization claims nearly 10 million members and constituents.

Founding Animal Wellness Action and the Center for a Humane Economy

Since leaving HSUS, Pacelle founded Animal Wellness Action, a 501(c)(4) organization that does lobbying and political work, and Animal Wellness Action  PAC, which does non-partisan giving to candidates who support animal welfare. AWA helped oust Rep. Pete Sessions, R-Texas, in the November 2018 election and also Rep. Dana Rohrbacher, D-Calif., whom Pacelle indicated had been hostile to animal welfare issues during their long congressional careers. The organization has worked since its inception in 2018 to help pass six federal laws to advance animal welfare: the Parity in Animal Cruelty Enforcement Act, the Pet and Women's Safety Act, the Dog and Cat Meat Trade Prohibition Act, the Rescuing Animals With Rewards Act, the Preventing Animal Cruelty and Torture Act, and the Horseracing Integrity and Safety Act.  Animal Wellness Action and its partner organizations have been working to enforce the federal ban on cockfighting, with campaigns in Guam, Puerto Rico, and several states to halt rampant animal fighting and illegal trafficking of fighting animals.  The organization was also instrumental in passing Amendment 13 in Florida to ban greyhound racing.  That measure, approved with 69 percent to 31 percent in November 2018 shuttered all 12 Florida greyhound tracks by the close of 2020.

The Center for a Humane Economy focuses on improving the way corporations treat animals. It has launched a "Kangaroos Are Not Shoes" campaign to demand that Nike, adidas, and other athletic shoe companies stop buying kangaroo skins to make soccer cleats. Dozens of stores in California have stopped selling these shoes, and the campaign continues. The organization has other campaigns that including "Banning Greyhound Racing" and "Ending Torture in Testing," focused on ending U.S. Food and Drug Administration requirements for animal testing for all new drug development.

Criticism 
HSUS has faced criticism from various groups during Pacelle's tenure, including the Center for Consumer Freedom, which receives money from the food industry, and Protect the Harvest, which is funded by oilman Forrest Lucas.

Pacelle's resignation

In 2018, Chronicle of Philanthropy reported that Pacelle was under investigation for a "sexual relationship with an employee". In December 2018 HSUS launched an internal investigation, hiring the law firm Morgan, Lewis & Bockius to investigate three separate allegations of sexual harassment. The New York Times subsequently reported on an interview with a Humane Society employee who alleges Pacelle sexually assaulted her in his office. Pacelle has denied each allegation. The investigation also included female leaders who allegedly said their "warnings about his conduct went unheeded." The HSUS voted at the end of January 2019 to retain Pacelle as CEO, prompting seven board members to resign in protest. Other donors threatened to sever ties with the organization, insisting that Pacelle should resign instead. Donors like the Greenbaum Foundation, which donated nearly $100,000 to the HSUS in 2017, claimed they would likely stop funding the HSUS because of the board's handling the allegations against Pacelle. Other donors such as Nicole Brodeur had stopped providing funding when allegations came to light in October 2017. Facing internal and external dissent, Pacelle resigned on February 2, 2018.

Some defended Pacelle's placement as CEO. The Washington Post's Kathleen Parker offered support in the wake of Pacelle's resignation, claiming that it was not necessarily the best "for the organization he built or the animals it has served..." and thanked Pacelle for his "stewardship, advocacy and legendary work ethic." She added "No person is all one thing, good or bad, and Pacelle is no exception." Other affiliates of the organization supported Pacelle's resignation, claiming that the HSUS board had put Pacelle's fundraising abilities above concerns for other employees in their evaluation of the evidence against Pacelle. Iowa director Josh Skipworth claimed that it was "ridiculous to put the business outlook over the female employees" in the board's original decision to retain Pacelle as CEO. In March 2018, The Washington Post reported on the aftermath of Pacelle's resignation; the article details additional allegations of sexual harassment and assault involving Pacelle.

Food and agriculture industries 
The Center for Consumer Freedom has criticized Pacelle for holding animal-rights views, arguing, "When Wayne Pacelle took over, it ceased being an animal welfare group and suddenly became an animal rights group."

Under Pacelle, HSUS created state agriculture advisory councils. Members of the agriculture councils have criticized the direction of HSUS, arguing that the agriculture councils' influence has waned while more radical elements of HSUS have gained influence. One Nebraska rancher and spokesperson for the agriculture councils claimed that Pacelle allowed HSUS to become a "good ol' boys vegan club."

No Kill 
Nathan Winograd, a leader of the no-kill movement seeking to end most euthanasia in animal shelters, has been a critic of Pacelle, saying, "We have learned what we can expect under Mr. Pacelle's tenure. Platitudes, cliches, rhetoric, pretty words. But we cannot expect solutions."

Personal life

Wayne Pacelle is married to TV journalist Lisa Fletcher.

Recognition
Pacelle has been the subject of profiles by the New York Times Magazine (2008), the Los Angeles Times (2008), The New York Times (2007), The Wall Street Journal (2006), The Washington Post (2004), Newsweek (2007), and other major publications. In 2014, he was named one of the Non-Profit Times' "Power and Influence Top 50." The citation read, "He has played a role in the passage of more than two-dozen federal statutes and 26 successful statewide ballot initiatives, which is why he is a punching bag for puppy mills and pseudo-PR firms that profit from animal cruelty."

For his management of HSUS's response to Hurricane Katrina, The NonProfit Times named Pacelle "Executive of the Year" (2005). In 2008, Pacelle also received a Special Achievement Award for Humanitarian Service from the National Italian American Foundation. The same year, Supermarket News named Pacelle one of its "Power 50", citing his leadership on farm animal welfare issues.

In 2018, Pacelle was noted in the book Rescuing Ladybugs by author and animal advocate Jennifer Skiff as having "arguably orchestrated more positive legal change for animals than any human being in modern times, during the period he was head of the Humane Society of the United States (HSUS) from 2004 to 2018."

Books 

The Humane Economy

 The book was on the New York Times, Washington Post, and Los Angeles Times best-seller lists.

The Bond

  The book was on the New York Times best-seller list.

In addition to The Humane Economy and The Bond, Pacelle has contributed to the following books:
  Foreword by Wayne Pacelle.
 
 Introduction by Jane Goodall; Afterword by Wayne Pacelle.
  (From the Foreword by Wayne Pacelle.)
  A book about Cleveland Amory. Foreword by Wayne Pacelle.

He and his brother, Richard Pacelle Jr., chair of the University of Tennessee Department of Political Science, co-authored a paper on the legislative history of animal fighting in Society & Animals, an academic journal focused on human-animal studies.  
 "A Legislative History of Nonhuman Animal Fighting in the U.S. and Its Territories, Society & Animals", November 2020, pp 1–21.

See also
 List of animal rights activists
 List of vegans
 The Humane Society of the United States (HSUS)
 Animal liberation movement
 Eco-terrorism
 People for the Ethical Treatment of Animals (PETA)
 Animal Liberation Front (ALF)
 Killing of Cecil the lion, for Pacelle's comments therein

References

External links
 
 CEO-Designate Wayne Pacelle Believes Animal Welfare Is a Mission, Not a Job (April 27, 2004)
 Humane Society Legislative Fund (HSLF)
 The Long Road to Animal Welfare: How Activism Works in Practice (Council on Foreign Relations, Inc.)

1965 births
American activists
American nonprofit chief executives
American people of Italian descent
American people of Greek descent
Animal welfare workers
Living people
Yale University alumni